South Western Pirkanmaa  is a subdivision of the Pirkanmaa region. It has been one of the Sub-regions of Finland since 2009.

Municipalities
Punkalaidun 
Sastamala

Politics
Results of the 2018 Finnish presidential election:

 Sauli Niinistö   64.6%
 Laura Huhtasaari   8.9%
 Pekka Haavisto   7.1%
 Paavo Väyrynen   6.5%
 Matti Vanhanen   5.2%
 Tuula Haatainen   4.3%
 Merja Kyllönen   3.2%
 Nils Torvalds   0.2%

Sub-regions of Finland
Geography of Pirkanmaa